Kenneth Giles (died 1974) was a British crime writer. Giles wrote books under his own name, as well as the pseudonyms Charles Drummond and Edmund McGirr.

Giles started as a sporting journalist, and used what he learned there as background for the Drummond novels.

The Drummond books star Sgt. Reed, while the McGirr books star a private eye.

Incomplete Bibliography
Some Beasts No More (1965)
The Big Greed (1966)  
A Provenance of Death (1966)
The Funeral Was in Spain (1966) (as Edmund McGirr) 
Death at the Furlong Post (1967) (as Charles Drummond)
Death in Diamonds (1967)
The Lead-Lined Coffin (1968) (as Edmund McGirr)
The Odds on Death (1969) (as Charles Drummond)
Death and Mr. Prettyman (1967)
Here Lies My Wife (1967) (as Edmund McGirr)
A Hearse with Horses (1967) (as Edmund McGirr)
Death among the Stars (1968)Death Cracks a Bottle (1969)Death and the Leaping Ladies (1969) (as Charles Drummond)An Entry of Death (1969) (as Edmund McGirr)A Death in the Church (1970)Stab in the Back (1970) (as Charles Drummond)Murder Pluperfect (1970)
No Better Fiend (1971) (as Edmund McGirr)
A Death at the Bar (1972) (as Charles Drummond)
The Lead-Lined Coffin (?) (as Edmund McGirr
An Entry of Death (?) (as Edmund McGirr)
Death Pays the Wages  (as Edmund McGirr)
A File on Death (1973)
Bardel's Murder (1973) (as Edmund McGirr)
A Murderous Journey (1974) (as Edmund McGirr)

British mystery writers
British crime fiction writers
1974 deaths
Year of birth missing